The Stefan Bergman Prize is a mathematics award, funded by the estate of the widow of mathematician Stefan Bergman and supported by the American Mathematical Society. The award is granted for mathematical research in: "1) the theory of the kernel function and its applications in real and complex analysis; or 2) function-theoretic methods in the theory of partial differential equations of elliptic type with attention to Bergman's operator method."

The award is given in honor of Stefan Bergman, a mathematician known for his work on complex analysis. Recipients of the prize are selected by a committee of judges appointed by the American Mathematical Society. The monetary value of the prize is variable and based on the income from the prize fund; in 2005 the award was valued at approximately $17,000.

Laureates 
 1989 David W. Catlin
 1991 Steven R. Bell, Ewa Ligocka
 1992 Charles Fefferman
 1993 Yum-Tong Siu
 1994 John Erik Fornæss
 1995 Harold P. Boas, Emil J. Straube
 1997 David E. Barrett, Michael Christ
 1999 John P. D'Angelo
 2000 Masatake Kuranishi
 2001 László Lempert, Sidney Webster
 2003 M. Salah Baouendi, Linda Preiss Rothschild
 2004 Joseph J. Kohn
 2005 Elias Stein
 2006 Kengo Hirachi
 2007-08 Alexander Nagel, Stephen Wainger
 2009 Ngaiming Mok, Duong H. Phong
 2011 Gennadi Henkin
 2012 David Jerison, John M. Lee
 2013 Xiaojun Huang, Steve Zelditch
 2014 Sławomir Kołodziej, Takeo Ohsawa
 2015 Eric Bedford, Jean-Pierre Demailly 
 2016 Charles L. Epstein, François Trèves
 2017 Bo Berndtsson, Nessim Sibony
 2018 Johannes Sjöstrand
 2019 Franc Forstnerič, Mei-Chi Shaw
2020 Aline Bonami, Peter Ebenfelt

See also

 List of mathematics awards

References

Awards of the American Mathematical Society